or  is the fifth-largest glacier in mainland Norway.

Three outlet glaciers extend from the icecap. A small outlet spills over a subglacial ridge to the north damming an unnamed lake resulting in occasion outburst floods. To the east a large outlet extends towards the lake, Leirvatnet. A further outlet descends steeply to the west. The western and northern outlets are heavily crevassed, as is the snout of the eastern glacier calving into Leirvatnet. The glacier also calves into lake Blåmannsisvatnet, resulting in extensive crevasses in the glacier above that lake. Given the degree of crevassing at the margins, traversing the glacier can be dangerous, particularly in late spring or early summer when snow bridges may be weak.

Blåmannsisen drains into the local Norwegian hydropower networks operated by Elkem and Saltens Kraftsamband and into the one in Luleälv, Sweden. The ice-dammed lake on the northern margin occasionally produces jökulhlaups (also known as glacial lake outburst floods). Satellite imagery, including that used by Google Earth, shows extensive exposed firn suggesting the ELA has retreated in recent years in common with other temperate icecaps in Norway. The southern margin of the glacier exhibits a forefield exposed since the retreat from the 'Little Ice Age' maximum with a well formed end moraine marking a former margin.

See also
List of glaciers in Norway

Further reading

External links
 The largest glaciers in Norway
 Glaciological Investigations In Norway, 2007

Glaciers of Nordland
Fauske
Sørfold